David Duke (born 1950) is an American white supremacist and politician.

David Duke may also refer to:

David Duke (footballer) (born 1978), Scottish footballer
David Duke Jr. (born 1999), American basketball player
Dave Duke (born 1951), American basketball coach

See also
David Dukes (1945–2000), American character actor